The 309 Road is a  gravel road between the towns of Coromandel and Whitianga in New Zealand. It winds its way from Coromandel, on the west side of the Coromandel Peninsula, over the ranges to Whitianga, on the eastern side. There are two theories as to how it got its name: one is that there are 309 bends in the road, the other is that horse-drawn coaches used to take 309 minutes to travel it.

Places of interest along the road include Waiau Falls and the Kauri Grove, a stand of mature kauri trees.

Location

References

External links 
Things to See and Do On The '309 Road' at Mercury Bay Online
'The Famous 309 Road' on Coromandel  website
309 Road on TheCoromandel.com
The 309 Road in Google Street View

Roads in New Zealand
Thames-Coromandel District
Gravel roads